The Hammers may refer to:

 West Ham United F.C., a professional English football club
 PFC Minyor Pernik, a professional Bulgarian football club
 Forge FC, a professional Canadian soccer club
 69 Squadron IAF, an Israeli Air Force squadron